Richard Kaselowsky (14 August 1888 – 30 September 1944) was a German entrepreneur, industrialist, and member of the Nazi Party. He was the eldest son of the manufacturer Richard Kaselowsky, a deputy in the Prussian state parliament. He was killed in an air raid on Bielefeld during World War II.

References 

1888 births
1944 deaths
Businesspeople from Bielefeld
Nazi Party members
German civilians killed in World War II
Deaths by airstrike during World War II